John Michael Montgomery is an American country music artist. His discography comprises 11 studio albums, three compilation albums and 36 singles. Of his albums, six studio albums and his 1997 Greatest Hits album are all certified gold or higher by the RIAA, with the highest-certified being 1994's Kickin' It Up and his 1995 self-titled album, both at 4×Multi-Platinum certification for shipping four million copies. The former is also his highest-certified in Canada at 2× Platinum by the CRIA. Montgomery's first seven albums were all issued via Atlantic Records Nashville, with Pictures in 2002 being his first release for Warner Bros. Records after Atlantic closed its Nashville branch. His Christmas album Mr. Snowman and 2004's Letters from Home were also issued by Warner Bros., and his most recent album (2008's Time Flies) was released via Stringtown Records, his own label.

Of Montgomery's thirty-six singles, seven have reached Number One on the Billboard country singles charts: "I Love the Way You Love Me" (1993), "I Swear" (1994), "Be My Baby Tonight" (1994), "If You've Got Love" (1994), "I Can Love You Like That" (1995), "Sold (The Grundy County Auction Incident) (1995), and "The Little Girl" (2000). "I Swear" and "Sold" were also the Number One country singles of 1994 and 1995, respectively, according to the Billboard Year-End charts. Besides his seven Number Ones, Montgomery has had thirteen more Top Ten country hits in the US. One of these, "Friends" (1997), was also a Number One on the RPM country charts in Canada, as were all of his US Number Ones except "If You've Got Love" and "I Can Love You Like That". Several of Montgomery's singles also crossed over to the Billboard Hot 100, including three which reached Top 40 on that chart: 1998's "Hold On to Me" (#4 country, #33 pop), 2000's "The Little Girl" (#35 pop), and 2004's "Letters from Home" (#2 country, #24 pop).

Studio albums

1992–2000

2002–present

Compilation albums

Singles

1992–2000

2001–present

Other singles

Guest singles

Other charted songs

Music videos

Notes

References

Country music discographies
Discographies of American artists